Cisilia Ismailova (born 19 December 1998 in Amager, Denmark) is a Danish singer from Copenhagen better known by her mononym Cisilia. She was born to mixed Macedonian and Moroccan origins. Her debut album Unge øjne topped Hitlisten, the official Danish Albums chart with her hit single "Vi to datid nu" going double platinum in Denmark. She is signed to Nexus Music and distributed through Universal Music Denmark. At the Danish Music Awards 2015, she became the youngest winner ever (at the age of 16 years), when she won in the categories Hit of the Year ("Vi To Datid Nu") and Best New Artist.

Discography

Albums

Singles

References

External links 
 

1998 births
Living people
People from Copenhagen
Danish people of Macedonian descent
Danish people of Moroccan descent
Singers from Copenhagen
People from Amager
21st-century Danish  women singers